Metamora may refer to:

Metamora; or, The Last of the Wampanoags, 1829 play by John Augustus Stone
 Metamora (shipwreck) in Georgian Bay, Ontario, Canada
 Metamora, Illinois
 Metamora Township, Woodford County, Illinois
 Metamora, Indiana
 Metamora Township, Franklin County, Indiana
 Metamora, Michigan
 Metamora Township, Michigan
 Metamora, Ohio
 Metamora (band), an American folk/Celtic music group on Sugar Hill Records